Baaz may refer to:

 Baaz Rockshelter, prehistoric archaeological site in Syria
 Baaz (1953 film), Hindi film directed by Guru Dutt
 Baaz (1992 film), Hindi film directed by S. Subhash
 Baaz: A Bird in Danger, 2003 Hindi film directed by Tinnu Verma